Paul Yost could refer to: 

Paul Edward Yost (1919–2007), American inventor and balloonist
Paul A. Yost Jr. (born 1929), U.S. Coast Guard admiral